Mina Zdravkova (born 9 February 1999) is a competitive ice dancer for Bulgaria. With partner Christopher Martin Davis, she is the 2020 Bulgarian National Champion,  Bronze Medallist at the 2019 NRW Trophy, Silver Medallist at the 2020 Jégvirág Cup, and representative for Bulgaria at the 2020 European Championships, and 2021 World Figure Skating Championships. In her early career as a junior, Zdravkova represented Great Britain, partnered with Henry Aiken, attaining the Silver Medal at the 2013 British Junior National Championships.

Personal life 
Zdravkova was born in Varna, Bulgaria. She is the daughter of retired Bulgarian World Cup footballer Radoslav Zdravkov. Zdravkova is a vegetarian and has collaborated with Peta to promote ethical eating. Zdravkova has received international attention for her beauty and is frequently featured in lists of the most beautiful athletes.

Early career 
Zdravkova started skating with Henry Aiken in 2011. With Aiken she competed on the ISU Junior Grand Prix circuit and won the silver medal at the 2013 British Figure Skating Championships.

Career 
In 2014 Zdravkova partnered with Christopher Davis. Together they won the 2014/15 Bulgarian junior ice dance title. In 2015, Davis sustained a serious shoulder injury for which he underwent keyhole surgery in the USA. Post surgery, a significant recovery and rehab period was required away from the ice. The surgery was not successful, and the injury returned early in the 2016/17 season. A second surgery was conducted in Bulgaria in 2016 and was successful at abating any further problems. Starting in 2016 Zdravkova and Davis were coached solely by Marika Humphreys-Baranova and Vitaliy Baranov. Zdravkova and Davis returned to national level competition at the 2016/17 Bulgarian figure skating championships where they reclaimed their title. In 2018 Zdravkova and Davis first performed a program set to Bulgarian folk music. Their performance of this program at the 2019 Winter Universiade went viral in Bulgaria in 2019, amassing millions of views. During the 2019/20 season, Zdravkova and Davis qualified and competed at the 2020 European Figure Skating Championships placing 25th. The team also qualified for the 2020 World figure skating championships, but the event was cancelled due to COVID-19. Due to COVID-19 Zdravkova and Davis were unable to train on the ice for over 7 months. During this time they trained off-ice and made several PSAs for Bulgarian media urging compliance with public health safety measures. In December 2020, the Bulgarian National Championships were postponed until February 2021. Zdravkova and Davis reclaimed their title and were named to the world team. Zdravkova and Davis competed at the 2021 World Figure Skating Championships which were held in a bubble for the first time due to COVID-19 safety precautions, and placed 31st.

Results

With Christopher Martin Davis for Bulgaria

With Henry Aiken for Great Britain

Music and competitive routines

With Christopher Martin Davis

With Henry Aiken

References 

1999 births
Living people
Bulgarian female ice dancers
Competitors at the 2019 Winter Universiade
Sportspeople from Varna, Bulgaria